Schiraldi is an Italian surname. People with the surname include:

 Calvin Schiraldi (born 1962), American baseball player
 Gino Schiraldi (born 1958), Canadian soccer player
 Joe Schiraldi (born 1951), Canadian soccer player
 Vincent Schiraldi, American juvenile justice

Italian-language surnames